Running Scared may refer to:

In film
 Running Scared (1972 film), a drama film starring Robert Powell
 Running Scared (1980 film), an action film starring Ken Wahl and Judge Reinhold
 Running Scared (1986 film), an action/comedy buddy cop film starring Gregory Hines and Billy Crystal
 Running Scared (2006 film), an action/thriller film starring Paul Walker

In literature and publications
 Running Scared, a 1964 novel by Gregory Mcdonald
 Running Scared, a 1998 novel by Ann Granger

In music
 "Running Scared" (Eurovision 2011 winning song)
 "Running Scared" (Roy Orbison song)
 "Running Scared", a song by Nik Kershaw from Radio Musicola
 "Sweet Freedom" (Michael McDonald song) (AKA, "'Running Scared' theme" from the 1986 film)

In television
 Running Scared (TV series), a British children's drama series